Third Album for the Sun is the second album by Dissolve, released on 4 August 1997 through Kranky.

Track listing

Personnel 
Arnold Van Bussell – bass guitar, engineering
John Chrisstoffels – cello, drums
Chris Heaphy – guitar, keyboards, bongos, percussion
Roy Montgomery – guitar, keyboards, bongos, percussion, mixing
Kaye Woodward – guitar, vocals

References 

1997 albums
Dissolve (band) albums
Kranky albums